Franz Poledne (10 April 1873, Vienna - 7 January 1932, Klosterneuburg) was an Austrian painter and illustrator; best known for his vedute of Vienna.

Life and work 
In 1888, while still a teenager, he began working in the studios of the set decorator, Hermann Burghart. He worked there until 1893. During that time, he attended the drawing school at the Höhere Graphische Bundes-Lehr- und Versuchsanstalt (Higher Federal Graphical Training and Research Institute). From 1907 until his death, he worked for the Illustrierte Kronen Zeitung.

As a painter, he produced oils and watercolors. His vedute documented the changes taking place in early 20th century Vienna, and he was one of a group of painters, including Rudolf von Alt,  and  who created the familiar, sentimental image of ""

He took part in World War I as a Master Corporal in the Landsturm, a reserve unit composed of older men. He was also one of the numerous painters who were employed by the 

He died following a serious illness.

References

External links 

 More works by Poledne @ ArtNet

1873 births
1932 deaths
Austrian painters
Austrian watercolourists
Cityscape artists
Austrian illustrators
Artists from Vienna
Austro-Hungarian painters